Plasmodium vinckei is a parasite of the genus Plasmodium subgenus Vinckeia. As in all Plasmodium species, P. vinckei has both vertebrate and insect hosts. The vertebrate hosts for this parasite are rodents.

Taxonomy 
This species was first described in 1952 by Rodhain. Several subspecies have been described since.

Subspecies 
P. v. brucechwatti
P. v. chabaudi
P. v. lentum
P. v. petteri
P. v. vinckei

Distribution 
This species is found in Central Africa including the Democratic Republic of the Congo and Nigeria.

Vectors 
 Anopheles cinctus
 Anopheles dureni

References

Further reading

vinckei
Parasites of rodents